Carugo is a comune (municipality) in the Province of Como in the Italian region Lombardy, located about  north of Milan and about  southeast of Como.

Carugo borders the following municipalities: Arosio, Brenna, Giussano, Inverigo, Mariano Comense.

Demographic evolution

References

Cities and towns in Lombardy